Singai is a town located in Sarawak, Malaysia. It is located several kilometers southwest of Kuching.

Coordinates
 Latitude = 1.5
 Longitude = 110.1667
 Latitude (DMS) = 1° 30' 0 N
 Longitude (DMS) = 110° 10' 0 E

Towns in Sarawak